Lars Sigurd Sunnanå (born 28 May 1946) is a Norwegian journalist.

Personal life
Sunnanå was born in Karmøy and grew up in Porsgrunn. He is a nephew of Klaus Sunnanå. He is married and his son Lars Magne Sunnanå is a former local politician (Conservative) in Bærum, where the family lives. Lars Sigurd Sunnanå was himself a member of the Norwegian Young Conservatives in his youth. He is also a freemason.

Career
He worked in Varden and Aftenposten in his early career. He was awarded the Narvesen Prize in 1971. In 1972 he was hired by Norwegian Broadcasting Corporation. He was their Middle East correspondent from 1999 to 2003, and in 2010, he began as NRK's Africa correspondent based in Nairobi. His tenure ended in 2013.

In 2004 he wrote the book Saddams fortrolige together with Saddam Hussein's physician Ala Bashir. The book was translated to English, French, Arabic, Danish, Finnish, German, Swedish, Dutch, Estonian, Spanish, Japanese and Russian. In 2005 came Oppdraget. Innsidehistorien om Saddams atomvåpen, about nuclear weapons in Iraq, together with Jafar D. Jafar and Numan Saadaldin al-Niaimi. In 2008 came Skibbrudd. En dokumentar om Redningsselskapets skjulte liv, a critical book about the Norwegian Society for Sea Rescue.

References

1946 births
Living people
People from Karmøy
People from Porsgrunn
People from Bærum
Norwegian journalists
NRK people
Norwegian television reporters and correspondents
Norwegian expatriates in Kenya
Norwegian non-fiction writers
Norwegian Freemasons